Economy and Society is a quarterly peer-reviewed academic journal of theory and politics. It was established in 1971 and is published by Routledge. , its managing editor is Paul Langley (Durham University).

Abstracting and indexing
The journal is abstracted and indexed in the Social Sciences Citation Index and Scopus. According to the Journal Citation Reports, the journal has a 2021 impact factor of 4.182.

References

External links

Economics journals
Political science journals
Publications established in 1971
Quarterly journals
English-language journals